The Graveyard Shift is a late night talk, news & music show broadcast on Australian Broadcasting Corporation's Triple J network. Originally hosted by comedian Dave Callan, it is broadcast from the Melbourne studios. The show is currently on Saturday overnights from 1am, with chill out party until the break of dawn on Sunday mornings from 4-6am.
The Graveyard Shift first aired in 2005, replacing the simulcast of Rage (now broadcast on ABC1).

As of 23 January 2011, Paul Verhoeven is the presenter, as Callan has left to focus on his stand-up comedy.

External links
 Official website with The Graveyard Shift on triple j

Triple J programs